The University System of Ohio is the public university system of the state of Ohio. It is governed by the Ohio Department of Higher Education.

The system includes all of Ohio's public institutions of higher education: 14 four-year research universities, 24 branch and regional campuses, 23 community colleges and technical colleges, and 13 graduate schools, seven medical schools, six law schools, and ten business schools within campuses. Additionally, some campuses offer Adult Workforce Education (AWE) and Adult Basic and Literacy Education (ABLE) programs. The AWE and ABLE programs were transferred from the Ohio Department of Education to the Ohio Board of Regents in 2009 to provide a flexible system of higher education that will improve services while reducing costs to students. The total annual enrollment of University System of Ohio institutions was over 526,003 as of 2020.

History
The University System of Ohio was unified under Governor Ted Strickland in 2007. In 2008, Chancellor Eric Fingerhut proposed creating common academic calendars for all of the system's universities: the goal was to simplify transfer between institutions and allow students to be recruited at the same time for jobs and internships. After spending more than $26 million starting in 2008, the transition was completed by the 2012 academic year.

Colleges and universities

University main campuses

University regional campuses
Central State, Cleveland State, NEOMED, Shawnee State, Toledo, and Youngstown State do not have regional campuses.

 Bowling Green State University
 Bowling Green State University Firelands
 Kent State University
 Kent State University at Ashtabula
 Kent State University at East Liverpool
 Kent State University at Geauga
 Kent State University at Salem
 Kent State University at Stark
 Kent State University at Trumbull
 Kent State University at Tuscarawas
 Miami University
 Miami University Hamilton
 Miami University Middletown
 Miami University Voice of America Learning Center
 Ohio University
 Ohio University Chillicothe
 Ohio University Eastern
 Ohio University Lancaster
 Ohio University Southern
 Ohio University Zanesville
 Ohio State University
 Ohio State University Agricultural Technical Institute
 Ohio State University at Lima
 Ohio State University at Mansfield  
 Ohio State University at Marion 
 Ohio State University at Newark
 University of Akron
 University of Akron Wayne College
 University of Cincinnati
 University of Cincinnati Blue Ash College
 University of Cincinnati Clermont College
 Wright State University
 Wright State University Lake Campus

Community colleges and technical colleges

Belmont College — St. Clairsville and Cadiz
Central Ohio Technical College — Newark
Cincinnati State Technical & Community College — Cincinnati
Clark State Community College — Springfield and Beavercreek
Columbus State Community College — Columbus
Cuyahoga Community College — Cleveland
Eastern Gateway Community College — Steubenville
Edison State Community College — Piqua
Hocking College — Nelsonville
James A. Rhodes State College — Lima
Lakeland Community College — Kirtland
Lorain County Community College — Elyria
Marion Technical College — Marion
North Central State College — Mansfield
Northwest State Community College — Archbold
Owens Community College — Toledo and Findlay
Rio Grande Community College - Rio Grande
Sinclair Community College — Dayton and Mason
Southern State Community College — Hillsboro, Fincastle, Wilmington, and Washington Court House
Stark State College — North Canton,Akron
Terra State Community College — Fremont
Washington State Community College — Marietta
Zane State College — Zanesville

References

External links
Home page and Strategic plan for the University System of Ohio

 
Public education in Ohio
 University System of Ohio
O
2007 establishments in Ohio